Senhor do Bonfim is a municipality in the state of Bahia in the North-East region of Brazil.

EC Ipatinga de Bahia is the local association football team.

References

External links
Municipality Website

Municipalities in Bahia